Leo I may refer to:

People 
 Pope Leo I (400–461), also known as Pope Saint Leo the Great
 Leo I (emperor), Roman emperor from 457 to 474
 Leo I, Prince of Armenia (d. 1140)
 Leo I, King of Armenia (1150–1219), sometimes also referred to as Leo II, or Levon I the Magnificent, first king of Cilician Armenia

Other 
LEO (computer), first computer used for commercial business applications
Leo I (dwarf galaxy), a dwarf galaxy that orbits the Milky Way Galaxy, and can be seen in the constellation of Leo
The Leo I Group, a group of galaxies also known as the M96 Group

See also
 Leo II (disambiguation)

tr:I. Leo